The Vengeur was a  74-gun ship of the line of the French Navy.

In 1792, captained by Le Dall Kéréon, she was part to a squadron under Latouche-Tréville.  On 26 August, she bombarded the city of Onaglia.

On 12 December 1792, she ran aground off Ajaccio. After attempts to refloat her proved unsuccessful, she was abandoned. She sank on 8 June 1793.

External links 
 Ships of the line

Ships of the line of the French Navy
Téméraire-class ships of the line
1789 ships